The Quadiriki Caves (other spellings include: Guadirikiri Caves, or Quadirikiri Cave) are located in Arikok National Park on the island of Aruba. There are three caves, which tourists commonly explore. The caves are located at the base of a limestone cliff. They contain Amerindian petroglyphs. The name of the caves is of Arawak origin.

The limestone cave contains stalactites and stalagmites.

A mythical folk tale relates to a daughter of an Indian chief who fell in love and was imprisoned in the cave as her lover was not acceptable to her father. Her beloved one was imprisoned nearby, in Huliba Cave (Tunnel of Love), but both lovers managed to meet underground. Both reportedly died in the cave and their spirit vanished into heaven through the holes in the roof of the cave.

References 

Caves of Aruba
Caves of the Caribbean